Leucodermia is a genus of lichen-forming fungi in the family Physciaceae.

Taxonomy
The genus was circumscribed by German lichenologist Klaus Kalb in 2015, with Leucodermia leucomelos assigned as the type species. Leucodermia includes lichens that were previously classified in genus Anaptychia section Polyblastidium series leucomelaenae. The genus name combines leucomelaenae with Heterodermia. Klaus included 10 species in his original circumscription of the genus; Leucodermia guzmaniana was added as a newly described species in 2019.

Description
Characteristics of genus Leucodermia include a thallus that is either leafy (foliose) to somewhat bushy (subfruticose) with lobes that are linear-elongate, ribbon-like, and dichotomously branched. The lobes have conspicuous, long rhizines at their margins. The thallus is loosely attached to the substrate and lacks a lower cortex. The apothecia often have pruinose discs and Polyblastidium-type ascospores, with sporoblastidia (small chambers in a thick-walled spore).

Species

Leucodermia appalachensis  – United States
Leucodermia arsenei  – Mexico
Leucodermia borphyllidiata  – Thailand
Leucodermia boryi  – widespread
Leucodermia ciliatomarginata 
Leucodermia circinalis  – South America
Leucodermia fertilis  – South America
Leucodermia guzmaniana  – Mexico
Leucodermia leucomelos  – widespread
Leucodermia lutescens  – Mexico; South America
Leucodermia vulgaris  – South America

References

Caliciales
Caliciales genera
Lichen genera
Taxa described in 2015
Taxa named by Klaus Kalb